HMS Duckworth (K351) was a  of the Royal Navy. She served during the Second World War as a convoy escort and anti-submarine warfare vessel in the Battle of the Atlantic and was an effective U-boat killer, being credited with the destruction of five U-boats during the conflict.

Construction
Duckworth was ordered on 10 January 1942, as DE-61, long-hulled turbo-diesel (TE) type destroyer escort, one of more than 500 such vessels built for ASW to a collaborative British-American design. Laid down on 16 January 1943, by the Bethlehem Hingham Shipyard, in Massachusetts, she was launched on 1 May 1943, as USS Gary in honour of Thomas J. Gary, a Texan who died in the attack on Pearl Harbor. She was transferred to the Royal Navy under Lend-Lease on completion on 4 August 1943, and named for John Thomas Duckworth, a RN officer of the late 18th and early 19th centuries. Duckworths pennant number was K351.

Service history
After commissioning Duckworth was assigned to Western Approaches Command, as the senior officer's ship of 3rd Escort Group.

On her first transatlantic convoy Duckworth was involved in the battle around convoy SC 143, which saw one warship and one merchant ship sunk, for the destruction of three U-boats. On 9 October Duckworth was able to assist in saving survivors from Yorkmar, the merchant ship lost.

Duckworth and 3EG were active throughout the remainder of the Atlantic campaign, as a support group and on ASW patrol.

Duckworth counterattacked, damaging U-445, which was forced to return to base.

Duckworth and  counter-attacked, damaging U-764 which escaped to Brest.

On 29 June the group followed up an attack by an RAF Liberator on a U-boat in the Channel west of Guernsey. A search by Duckworth and the group found and destroyed , their first success.

Duckworth and  carried out a series of attacks which destroyed U-618.

in October 1944 3EG were assigned to Arctic convoys JW 61 and JW 61A, with several other Western Approaches groups. Though JW 61 came under attack by group Panther it suffered no hits and no losses; all ships arrived safely. On the return 3EG assisted the passage of RA 61 by sweeping the Kola inlet ahead of the convoy; during this operation  of 15EG was torpedoed, she survived but was later declared a constructive total loss. Both RA 61 and RA 61A returned without interference.

In December 1944 and into the new year Duckworth and 3EG were on patrol and escort duty in the Irish Sea but had little success.

On 24 February 1945, following an attack on coastal convoy BTC 78, Duckworth along with her sister ship , another frigate of the Captain class, found and destroyed the U-boat responsible after a six-hour hunt. This vessel was identified post-war as the German U Boat  and was thought to be sunk in the English Channel between Land's End and the Scilly Isles. However, further research following the discovery of a wreck destroyed by an underwater mine at a later time near Poole identified that vessel as U-480, and the U-boat destroyed on 24 February is now thought to be , which was dived and identified by nautical archaeologist Innes McCartney in 2005.

On 29 March following an attack on BTC 111 Duckworth found and attacked a U-boat in Mount's Bay and destroyed it.

Duckworth was returned to the US after the war and scrapped in 1946.

Battle honours
Duckworth earned the following battle honours for service:
 Atlantic 1943–44
 Arctic 1944
 Normandy 1944
 English Channel 1945

Successes
During her service Duckworth was credited with the destruction of five U-boats.

Notes

References
 Clay Blair : Hitler's U-Boat War Vol II: The Hunted 1942–1945 (1998) 
P Elliott : Allied Escort Ships of World War II (1977)  
R Gardiner, R Gray : Conway's All the World's Fighting Ships 1906–1921 (1985)  
Arnold Hague : The Allied Convoy System 1939–1945 (2000).  (Canada);  (UK).
Paul Kemp  : U-Boats Destroyed  ( 1997) . 
Axel Neistle  : German U-Boat Losses during World War II  (1998).

External links
HMS Duckworth at uboat.net
 HMS Duckworth at captain class frigates association
Gary/Duckworth (DE-61) at DANFS (hazegray.org)

Captain-class frigates
Ships built in Hingham, Massachusetts
Buckley-class destroyer escorts
1943 ships